Á, á (a-acute) is a letter of the Chinese (Pinyin), Blackfoot, Czech, Dutch, Faroese, Galician, Hungarian, Icelandic, Irish, Lakota, Navajo, Occitan, Portuguese, Sámi, Slovak, Spanish, Vietnamese, Welsh, and Western Apache languages as a variant of the letter a. It is sometimes confused with à; e.g. "5 pommes á $1", which is supposed to be written as "5 pommes à $1" (meaning "5 apples at 1 dollar each" in French).

Usage in various languages

Chinese 
In Chinese pinyin á is the yángpíng tone (陽平/阳平 "high-rising tone") of "a".

Dutch
In Dutch, the Á is used to put emphasis on an "a", either in a long "a" form like in háár ("hair"), or in a short form like in kán (the verb "can").

Irish 
In Irish, á is called a fada ("long a"), pronounced  and appears in words such as slán ("goodbye"). It is the only diacritic used in Modern Irish, since the decline of the dot above many letters in the Irish language. Fada is only used on vowel letters i.e. á, é, í, ó, ú. It symbolises a lengthening of the vowel.

Czech, Hungarian, and Slovak 
Á is the 2nd letter of the Czech, Hungarian and Slovak languages and represents the sound .

Faroese 

Icelandic 
Á is the second letter of the Icelandic alphabet and represents  (as in "ow").

Kazakh 

In the 2018 amends of Kazakh alphabet list, Á is defined as the second letter and represents . It has been replaced by Ä ä in the 2019 amends, and matches Cyrillic alphabet Ә, 2017 version Aʼ and Arabic ٵ.

Portuguese 
In Portuguese, á is used to mark a stressed  in words whose stressed syllable is in an abnormal location within the word, as in lá (there) and rápido (rapid, fast). If the location of the stressed syllable is predictable, the acute accent is not used. Á  contrasts with â, pronounced .

Scottish Gaelic
Á was once used in Scottish Gaelic, but has now been largely superseded by à. It can still be seen in certain writings, but it is no longer used in standard orthography.

Spanish 
In Spanish, á is an accented letter, pronounced just the way a is. Both á and a sound like /a/. The accent indicates the stressed syllable in words with irregular stress patterns. It can also be used to "break up" a diphthong or to avoid what would otherwise be homonyms, although this does not happen with á, because a is a strong vowel and usually does not become a semivowel in a diphthong. See Diacritic and Acute accent for more details.

Vietnamese 
In the Vietnamese alphabet, á is the sắc tone (high-rising tone) of a.

Welsh 
In Welsh, word stress usually falls on the penultimate syllable, but one way of indicating stress on a final (short) vowel is through the use of the acute accent. The acute accent on a is often found in verbal nouns and borrowed words, for example, casáu  "to hate", caniatáu  "to allow", carafán  "caravan".

Character mappings

See also 
 Acute accent
 À

References 

A-acute
Polish letters with diacritics